Bacillarnavirus is a genus of viruses in the order Picornavirales. Marine diatoms serve as natural hosts. There are three species in this genus.

Taxonomy
The genus contains the following three species:
Chaetoceros socialis forma radians RNA virus 1
Chaetoceros tenuissimus RNA virus 01
Rhizosolenia setigera RNA virus 01

Structure
Viruses in Bacillarnavirus are non-enveloped, with icosahedral, spherical, and round geometries, and T=pseudo3 symmetry. The diameter is around 30-32 nm. Genomes are linear and non-segmented, around 8.8-9.5kb in length. The genome has 2 open reading frames.

Life cycle
Viral replication is cytoplasmic. Entry into the host cell is achieved by attachment of the virus to host receptors, which mediates endocytosis. Replication follows the positive stranded RNA virus replication model. Positive stranded RNA virus transcription is the method of transcription. Marine diatoms serve as the natural host.

References

External links
 Viralzone: Bacillarnavirus
 ICTV

Picornavirales
Virus genera